Putfile was a free file hosting service started in January 2004 that provided video and photo hosting services. It was originally owned by Putfile Limited in Godalming, Surrey, Great Britain, and on February 6, 2007, it was purchased by ZVUE Corporation, an internet media company.

Uploading
Putfile accepted files in most common video, music, audio, and image formats. There was a 5 MB image size limit. File size maximums for videos and Flash files were repeatedly increased; as of July 2007, the maximum file size was 200MB.

Media could be rated on a scale from 1 (worst) to 5 (best). Statistics were kept on the number of views a file had and its average rating. The site provided links to the highest rated and most viewed media.

Registration was free. As of December 2005, text ads were being sold on Putfile.

Viewing media
The photo upload tool allowed users to upload multiple photos at once with an easy to use thumbnail preview mode. Once photos for upload were selected they were automatically resized and then uploaded to albums of the user's choosing. Motion in GIF format images tended to be dysfunctional.

Putfile prohibited the uploading of pornographic or offensive material.

As of 14 October 2008 the site stopped allowing new uploads or new users.

On April 23, 2009, Putfile went offline.

References

External links
Alexa
 Acquisition by Handheld Entertainment Inc.

Internet properties established in 2004
Products and services discontinued in 2009
File hosting
Defunct American websites
Defunct video on demand services
Former video hosting services